MacKenzie Caitlin May (born January 12, 1999) is an American professional volleyball player who plays as an outside hitter for the Italian Series A1 professional team Volley Bergamo. Collegiately, she played for UCLA.

Personal life

May was born and raised in Dubuque, Iowa. She began playing volleyball at age 7 and by age 8 she was playing on a team for 13 year olds. She attended Wahlert Catholic High School where she was a three-sport athlete as she played volleyball, track and field and soccer. She was considered the number 10 national recruit in her graduating class.

Career

College

May played both indoor and beach volleyball while at UCLA. She played indoor college volleyball for a total of five years, as she opted to use the extra year of eligibility granted by the NCAA due to the COVID-19 pandemic. She was named to the Pac-12 All-Freshman Team in 2017. During her final three seasons, she was named an All-American and was a two-time Pac-12 Player of the Year. She finished her indoor career at UCLA as the only Bruin in program history to rank top 3 on UCLA's all-time kills (3rd, 2,065) and aces (3rd, 178) lists.

She played beach volleyball for UCLA in 2018, 2019, and 2020 where she finished with a career record of 38-13. She was part of UCLA's back-to-back NCAA Beach Volleyball Championship titles in 2018 and 2019.

Professional clubs

  Volley Bergamo (2021–)

Awards and honors

College

Three-time AVCA All-American (First Team – 2021, 2020; Second Team – 2019)
Two-time Pac-12 Player of the Year (2019, 2021)

References

1999 births
Living people
Sportspeople from Dubuque, Iowa
Outside hitters
Opposite hitters
American women's volleyball players
American women's beach volleyball players
UCLA Bruins women's volleyball players
UCLA Bruins women's beach volleyball players
American expatriate sportspeople in Italy
Expatriate volleyball players in Italy
Serie A1 (women's volleyball) players